Sarah Long (18 March 1938 – 23 November 1987) was an English actress and television presenter.

Born in London, she is best remembered for her long run as a presenter on the preschool children's television series Play School from September 1971 until May 1986. On stage, as a young actress, her first West End success came as Anne Callifer in Graham Greene's The Potting Shed; she also portrayed another Anne in The Diary of Anne Frank. She also appeared in films and television, notably as Evelyn Harrington in Village of the Damned (1960) and as the young Queen Mary in the film adaptation of Henry VIII and his Six Wives (1972).

She was married to the television actor Peter Baldwin, and they had two children.

She died in London of cancer on 23 November 1987, at the age of 49.

References

External links
 

1938 births
1987 deaths
English film actresses
English television presenters
Actresses from London
20th-century English actresses
English television actresses
Deaths from cancer in England
BBC television presenters